With Her (stylized as with HER) is the fourth extended play by South Korean singer Crush. It consists of five tracks including the title track "Let Me Go". In accordance with the album title, each track features a female artist. The album was released on October 20, 2020, by P Nation, under license by Dreamus.

Background and release
On October 12, 2020, P Nation announced that Crush's fourth EP would be released on October 20, 2020. This marked Crush's first project following his album From Midnight to Sunrise, released in December 2019. On October 19, 2020, the music video teaser for the lead single "Let Her Go" was released and the featured artist of title track is Taeyeon, making it their first collaboration in four years, having previously collaborated on the song, "Don't Forget" in 2016. In 2020, the EP originally peaked at position 23 on the Gaon Album chart, but in March 2021 the EP re-entered the chart at a new peak of 21.

Track listing

Charts

Release history

References 

2020 EPs
Crush (singer) albums
Korean-language EPs